Windham County may refer to:

Places
Two counties in the United States:
Windham County, Connecticut
Windham County, Vermont

Ships
USS LST-1170, a United States Navy landing ship tank commissioned in 1954 and renamed USS Windham County (LST-1170) in 1955